In mathematics, a function between topological spaces is called proper if inverse images of compact subsets are compact. In algebraic geometry, the analogous concept is called a proper morphism.

Definition

There are several competing definitions of a "proper function". 
The two definitions are equivalent if  is locally compact and Hausdorff.

Let  be a closed map, such that  is compact (in ) for all  Let  be a compact subset of  It remains to show that  is compact.

Let  be an open cover of  Then for all  this is also an open cover of  Since the latter is assumed to be compact, it has a finite subcover. In other words, for every  there exists a finite subset  such that 
Hence the set
 
is open in  It follows that  contains the point 
Now  and because  is assumed to be compact, there are finitely many points  such that  Furthermore, the set  is a finite union of finite sets, which makes  a finite set.

A map is universally closed if for any topological space  the map  is closed. In the case that  is Hausdorff, this is equivalent to requiring that for any map  the pullback  be closed, as follows from the fact that  is a closed subspace of 

Properties

 Every continuous map from a compact space to a Hausdorff space is both proper and closed.
 Every surjective proper map is a compact covering map.
 A map  is called a  if for every compact subset  there exists some compact subset  such that  
 A topological space is compact if and only if the map from that space to a single point is proper.

Generalization

It is possible to generalize 
the notion of proper maps of topological spaces to locales and topoi, see .

See also

Citations

References

 
 , esp. section C3.2 "Proper maps"
 , esp. p. 90 "Proper maps" and the Exercises to Section 3.6.
 
 

Theory of continuous functions